The 1993 Azeri coup d'état, also known as Ganja Uprising, took place on 4 June 1993 by militia led by military commander Surat Huseynov, which overthrew President Abulfaz Elchibey and brought Heydar Aliyev to power. 

While the Azerbaijan lost the war which opposed it to the Armenia, president Abulfaz Elchibey sent the Commander Surat Huseynov due to its military failures. It thereby created a hostile militia to the Government, precipitating the defeat of the Azerbaijan. 

However, Elchibey's government had been discredited by Huseynov's military victories, which formed his militia in his native Nakhchivan, with weapons provided by the Russian army. Immediately afterwards, dozens of Elchibey government officials resigned and protests erupting demanding a change of government. Faced with this situation, Elchibey supported the candidacy for the parliament's presidency of Heydar Aliyev.

Some days after, on 15 June, Huseynov's militia took the capital, Baku, forcing president Abulfaz Elchibey to flee, and making Aliyev president. Immediately, Aliyev was ratified by parliament and a referendum held on 29 August. Consequently, on 3 October Aliyev was elected constitutional president in the elections held that day.

Huseynov was elected prime minister by Aliyev.

Aliyev established an authoritarian regime and extended his government until 2003, when he was succeeded by his son Ilham Aliyev.

References 

 

1993 in Azerbaijan
Conflicts in 1993
1990s coups d'état and coup attempts
September 1993 events in Asia